William Grahme or William Graham (died 4 February 1713) was Dean of Carlisle from 1684  until 1704; and of Wells from then until his death in 1713.

He was joint Clerk of the Closet from 1702 until his death.

References

Year of birth missing
1713 deaths
Deans of Carlisle
Deans of Wells
Clerks of the Closet